Bowers House may refer to:

in the United States
(by state then city)
 Bowers House, an intentional community in the form of a student co-op in Hyde Park, Chicago, Illinois
 John S. Bowers House, Decatur, Indiana
 Bowers House (Wichita, Kansas), listed on the NRHP in Sedwick County
 Jerathmell Bowers House, Lowell, Massachusetts
 Jonathan Bowers House, Lowell, Massachusetts
 Joseph Bowers House, Amasa, Michigan
 Bowers Mansion, Reno, Nevada
 Bowers-Livingston-Osborn House, Parsippany, New Jersey
 Dr. Wesley Bowers House, Southampton, New York
 Bowers-Tripp House, Washington, North Carolina
 Hoffman-Bowers-Josey-Riddick House, Scotland Neck, North Carolina
 Dovel-Bowers House, Pickerington, Ohio, listed on the NRHP in Fairfield County
 George W. and Hetty A. Bowers House, Portland, Oregon, listed on the National Register of Historic Places
 Bowers-Kirkpatrick Farmstead, Gray, Tennessee, listed on the NRHP in Washington County
 Bowers-Felts House, Lufkin, Texas
 Bowers House (Sugar Grove, West Virginia)